Banafsh Tappeh Rural District is a rural district (dehestan) in Now Kandeh District, Bandar-e Gaz County, Golestan Province, Iran. At the 2006 census, its population was 2,114, in 573 families.  The rural district has 3 villages.

References 

Rural Districts of Golestan Province
Bandar-e Gaz County